The Idukki Dam is a double curvature arch dam constructed across the Periyar River in a narrow gorge between two granite hills locally known as Kuravan and Kurathi in Idukki, Kerala, India. At , it is one of the highest arch dams in Asia. It is constructed and owned by the Kerala State Electricity Board. It supports a 780 MW hydroelectric power station in Moolamattom, which started generating power on 4 October 1975. The dam type is a concrete, double curvature parabolic, thin arc dam. The Indo-Canadian project was inaugurated by the Prime Minister Indira Gandhi on February 17, 1976.

This dam was constructed along with two other dams at Cheruthoni and Kulamavu. The stored water is used to produce electricity at the Moolamattom Power house, which is located inside nearby rocky caves.

Narakakkanam, Azhutha, Vazhikkadavu, Vadakkepuzha and Kuttiar diversion schemes were later added to augment the Idukki reservoir .

History

Early surveys
The idea of constructing a dam for power generation was first conceived in 1919 in a report submitted by Italian engineer Jacob to the Travancore government, which was rejected.  As per history, Shri Chemban Karuvellayan Kolumban, the head of 'Oorali' tribe during 1922, showed the way to the Malankara Estate Superintendent W.J.John and his friend AC Thomas Edattu, who were on hunting trip to forests near the present Arch Dam. Upon hearing the legend of Kuravan and Kurathi Hills, Thomas impressed by the sight of water flow between the mountains; suggested the spot suitable for an Arch dam. In 1932, W.J.John submitted a report to the Government of Travancore on the possibility of constructing a dam at Idukki for Power Generation.

In 1935, assembly member Shri.K.A.Narayana Pillai brought the Idukki project to the attention of Government of Travancore. Italian engineers Angelo Omedayo and Clantheyo Masele conducted a study in 1937 but things didn't go forward.

In 1947, a preliminary investigation report was prepared and submitted by Sri. P. Joseph John, then The Chief Electrical Engineer to the Government of Travancore. It was during 1956 that the Central Water Commission conducted a detailed investigation based on the Government's request. The project report was prepared in 1961 and the Planning Commission accorded sanction for implementing the scheme in 1963. In 1964, under the leadership of Sri. E.U.Philipose, Superintending Engineer, preliminary works of the project were started.

Construction

The construction of this Dam commenced on 30 April 1969. The project lead by Dr.D.Babu Paul IAS, who appointed as Project Coordinator, Idukki Hydel Project & District Collector with several engineers like Sri. C.V Mathews, Sri. M. Ramachandran, (Retired Chief Engineers, Kerala State Electricity Board) .  The Government of Canada aided the Project with long-term loans and grants. SNC-Lavalin, Canada, a well-known firm of Consulting Engineers were advising and assisting Project Engineers under Canadian aid, while Hindustan Construction Company (a.k.a. HCC) of Walchand group won the bid for construction.

Storage of water in Idukki reservoir commenced in February, 1973. The inauguration of trial run of the first machine was celebrated on 4 October 1975. Commercial operation of the Power Station was Commissioned on 12 February 1976 by the then Prime Minister Smt. Indira Gandhi.

Features
The gross storage capacity of the dam is 1.996 cubic kms (70.50 tmc ft). About  of concrete was used in the construction of the dam. One thing to be noted is, Idukki Arch dam doesn't have any shutters to be opened so it has to rely on the Cheruthoni dam to maintain the reservoir water level.

Usage

[
{
  "type": "Feature",
  "geometry": { "type": "Point", "coordinates": [77.144167,9.528611, ] },
  "properties": {
    "title": "Mullaperiyar Dam",
   "description": "",
    "marker-symbol": "dam",
    "marker-size": "large",
    "marker-color": "0050d0"
  }
},
{
  "type": "Feature",
  "geometry": { "type": "Point", "coordinates": [76.976111,9.842778 ] },
  "properties": {
    "title": "Idukki Dam",
    "description": "",
    "marker-symbol": "dam",
    "marker-size": "large",
    "marker-color": "ff0000"
  }
},
{
  "type": "Feature",
  "geometry": { "type": "Point", "coordinates": [76.966944,9.845278] },
  "properties": {
    "title": "Cheruthoni Dam",
   "description": "",
    "marker-symbol": "dam",
    "marker-size": "large",
    "marker-color": "0050d0"
  }
},
{
  "type": "Feature",
  "geometry": { "type": "Point", "coordinates": [76.896111,9.802942] },
  "properties": {
    "title": "Kulamavu Dam",
   "description": "",
    "marker-symbol": "dam",
    "marker-size": "large",
    "marker-color": "0050d0"
  }
},
{
  "type": "Feature",
  "geometry": { "type": "Point", "coordinates": [ 77.124,10.106] },
  "properties": {
    "title": "Mattupetty Dam",
   "description": "",
    "marker-symbol": "dam",
    "marker-size": "large",
    "marker-color": "0050d0"
  }
},
{
  "type": "Feature",
  "geometry": { "type": "Point", "coordinates": [76.9548034,9.962278] },
  "properties": {
    "title": "Lower Periyar Dam",
    "marker-symbol": "dam",
    "marker-size": "large",
    "marker-color": "0050d0"
  }
},
{
  "type": "Feature",
  "geometry": { "type": "Point", "coordinates": [76.9968439,9.9829676] },
  "properties": {
    "title": "Kallarkutty Dam",
    "description": "",
    "marker-symbol": "dam",
    "marker-size": "large",
    "marker-color": "0050d0"
  }
},
{
  "type": "Feature",
  "geometry": { "type": "Point", "coordinates": [76.705833,10.221667] },
  "properties": {
    "title": "Idamalayar Dam",
   "description": "",
    "marker-symbol": "dam",
    "marker-size": "large",
    "marker-color": "0050d0"
  }
},
{
  "type": "Feature",
  "geometry": { "type": "Point", "coordinates": [77.1763,10.0218] },
  "properties": {
    "title": "Anayirankal Dam",
   "description": "",
    "marker-symbol": "dam",
    "marker-size": "large",
    "marker-color": "0050d0"
  }
},
{
  "type": "Feature",
  "geometry": { "type": "Point", "coordinates": [77.19,10.14] },
  "properties": {
    "title": "Kundala Dam",
   "description": "",
    "marker-symbol": "dam",
    "marker-size": "large",
    "marker-color": "0050d0"
  }
},
{
  "type": "Feature",
  "geometry": { "type": "Point", "coordinates": [76.662222,10.136389] },
  "properties": {
    "title": "Bhoothathankettu",
   "description": "",
    "marker-symbol": "dam",
    "marker-size": "large",
    "marker-color": "0050d0"
  }
}

]

Power Generation

The Project harnesses a major portion of the power potential of Periyar, the largest river in Kerala, by the creation of a reservoir of 2,000 M.cum (2 Billion Tonnes) capacity, diversion of waters thus impounded through a water conductor system consisting of a power tunnel and two underground pressure shafts to an underground power house situated in Moolamattom. The installed capacity of the Power House is 780 MW consisting of 6 Units of Pelton-type turbines with a power generation capacity of 130 MW each. The regulated waters of Periyar falls through a drop of about  while generating power in the underground power house. The generated power is given to two sub stations. One double circuit line to Kalamassery; one single circuit line to Tamil Nadu; One single circuit line to Pallom, 3 feeder bays for future.

Irrigation

The tail waters flowing to Kudayathurpuzha through tunnel and open channel is diverted for irrigation purposes in the Muvattupuzha Valley.

Tourist destination and attraction

Earlier, there was a blanket ban on public entry in to the dam due to security reasons. Later, it was relaxed opening the dam for public for 10 days during the Onam and the Christmas seasons. The duration has been increased to one month since last year. Cameras and cell phones are not allowed inside the dam area. The entry fee is Rs. 25 for adults and Rs. 5 for children. The fee for 15-minute boating service for five persons is Rs. 600.

Idukki is a well known tourist center in Kerala.

One can find elephants, bisons, sambar deer, wild dogs, jungle cats, tigers, wild boars etc. and a variety of snakes like cobra, viper, krait and a number of non-venomous snakes in this sanctuary. The birds of Idukki are Jungle fowl, myna, laughing thrush, black bulbul, peafowl, woodpecker, kingfisher, eagle etc.

See also

 2018 Kerala floods
List of dams and reservoirs in Kerala
 Kulamavu Dam
 Cheruthoni Dam
 Kallar Dam
 Erattayar Dam
 Azhutha Dam
 Vazhikadavu Weir
 Vadakkepuzha Weir
 Kuttiar Weir

References
www.kvidukki.Gov.in

External links

 
Idukki Dam shortfilm

Idukki Hydroelectric Project
Old Photos
 https://idukki.gov.in/tourist-place/idukki-arch-dam/
Interesting Facts about Idukki dam
Kendriya Vidyalaya, Idukki,Hill Station

Arch dams
Hydroelectric power stations in Kerala
Dams completed in 1973
1973 establishments in Kerala
Dams in Idukki district
20th-century architecture in India